The 2003 WNBA season was the sixth for the Washington Mystics.

Offseason

Dispersal Draft

WNBA Draft

Regular season

Season standings

Season schedule

Player stats

References

Washington Mystics seasons
Washington
Washington Mystics